Tamizhariyum Perumal is a Tamil language film starring V. A. Chellappa, M. G. Ramachandran and M. R. Santhanalakshmi. The film was released in 1942.

Plot
The story was concocted from the tale of Kalidasa, Sanskrit poet and dramatist.

Cast

Crew
 Producer: RM. Ramanathan Chettiar
 Production Company: Uma Pictures
 Director: T. R. Raghunath
 Music: Saraswathi Stores
 Lyrics: Udumalai Narayana Kavi
 Story: Elangovan 
 Screenplay: Elangovan
 Dialogues: Elangovan
 Art Direction:
 Editing: A. Kasilingam 
 Choreography: 
 Cinematography: Marcus Bartley & Mohammed Masthan 
 Stunt:
 Dance:

Soundtrack
Lyrics were penned by Udumalai Narayana Kavi. No one was given credit as music composer. Saraswathi Stores orchestra provided the music for songs sung by the artistes.
The song "Kalviyai pol" sung by V. A. Chellappa was a popular number.

Reception
In spite of good photography and music Tamizhariyum Perumal was not a commercial success. In 2011, film historian Randor Guy said it would be "remembered for the impressive sets, cinematography and pleasing music and being an early film of the later day icon and cult figure M.G. Ramachandran."

References

External links
 - Song by V. A. Chellappa

1940s Tamil-language films
1942 films
Indian black-and-white films
Films directed by T. R. Raghunath